Tim Sandidge (born June 12, 1983 in Lynchburg, Virginia) is an American football defensive tackle who is currently a member of the Montreal Alouettes.  He was originally signed by the St. Louis Rams as an undrafted free agent in 2006.  He played college football at Virginia Tech.

Sandidge was drafted by Team Tennessee of the All-American Football League in the second round, on January 26, 2008.

On February 16, 2008, Sandidge was signed by the Montreal Alouettes of the Canadian Football League.

Sandidge currently lives in Virginia with his wife,  Jessica Bean-Sandidge, and their 2 children.

External links
Virginia Tech Hokies bio

1983 births
Living people
American football defensive tackles
Virginia Tech Hokies football players
St. Louis Rams players
Kansas City Chiefs players
Hamburg Sea Devils players
San Diego Chargers players
Sportspeople from Lynchburg, Virginia